Woodhall railway station serves the eastern part of the town of Port Glasgow in Inverclyde, Scotland.

Woodhall station is staffed only on Monday to Saturday in the daytime.

Services 

On Sundays there is an hourly service in each direction.

Gallery

References

External links 

Woodhall Railway Station

Railway stations in Inverclyde
Former London, Midland and Scottish Railway stations
Railway stations in Great Britain opened in 1945
SPT railway stations
Railway stations served by ScotRail
Port Glasgow